The Fijian records in swimming are the fastest ever performances of swimmers from Fiji, which are recognised and ratified by Fiji Swimming.

All records were set in finals unless noted otherwise.

Long Course (50 m)

Men

Women

Mixed relay

Short Course (25 m)

Men

Women

Mixed relay

References
General
 Fijian Long Course records 4 September 2022 updated
 Fijian Short Course records 4 September 2022 updated
Specific

External links
 Fiji Swimming website

Fiji
Records
Swimming
swimming